Pogonochloa is a genus of plants in the grass family. The only known species is  Pogonochloa greenwayi, native to Zambia and Zimbabwe.

References

Chloridoideae
Monotypic Poaceae genera
Flora of Africa